The Sundorph House is a Neoclassical property at Ved Stranden 10 in the Old Town of Copenhagen, Denmark. The property has since the late 17th century been owned by members of the Sundorph family. The current building was constructed for tea merchant Mette Christine Sundorph after the previous building at the site had been destroyed in the Copenhagen Fire of 1795. It was listed in the Danish registry of protected buildings and places in 1918.

History

18th century

The site was in 1689 part of a larger property (then No. 211) owned by merchant (urtekræmmer) Thomas Torsmide's widow. In 1756, it was as No. 247 owned by Kommerceråd Jacob Olsen's widow.

Hans Pay, who was born in Drammen in 1738,  established as a porcelain seller in Copenhagen  1768. He was licensed as a grocer (urtekræmmer) in 1771 and 1776 but died in 1777. His widow, Mette Christine née Collstrup (1752-1834) took the operations of the company over but it was ceded to her new husband Søren Christian Sundorph (1743-1794) when she married on 21 December 1778. His birth name was Søren Christensen but he had assumed the name Sundorph after his home town Nørre Sundby in the north of Jutland.

When he died in 1794, Mette Christine Sundorph once again took over the operations of the company whose name was changed to Mette Christine sal. Sundorphs Enke & Co. ("Metta Christine late Sundorph's Widow & Co.).

The Sundorph House was together with most of the other buildings in the area  destroyed in the Copenhagen Fire of 1795. The company was then run from a wooden shed on Slotsholmen until the house at Ved Stranden had been rebuilt to a new design in 1797.

The name of the company was changed to Sundorphs Enke & søn (Sundorph's Widown & Son") when her elder of her two sonsson, Christian Severin Sundorph (f1780–1826), joined it in 1812. The younger son, Hans Pay Sundorph (1790–1860), joined the company in 1816 and became its sole owner with his brothers death in 1826. The company then took the name H. P. Sundorph. It was later passed on to his son, Georg Christian Sundorph (1826—1875), who had joined it in 1856. His widow, Anna Margrethe Sundorph (née v. Stöcken) ran it after his death. Her son, Hans Pay Sundorph, became a partner in the company in 1884 and its sole owner in 1894. It had by then become a tea wholesaler.

19th century
 
The property was at the time of the 1801 census home to a total of 18 people. Sundorph lived in the house with her six children, the associate Peder Jensen	and seven more employees.  Maria Sophie Fenger, a 28-year-old widow, was living on the property with her three-year-old daughter and a maid. The property was in the new cadastre of 1806 listed as No. 156.

The property was at the time of the 1845 census home to a total of 16 people. Hans Pay Sundorph and his wife Else Christine Marie Klinting resided with their two sons, two employees and three servants on the two lower floors. Ferdin. Cons. Schumacher resided with his wife, three children and two maids on the second floor. 

The Danish Chamber of Commerce (Grosserer-Societetet) was based in the building prior to their acquisition of the Exchange Building (Børsen) on the other side of the canal in 1857. The building was listed in 1918.

Architecture
The house is built in the Baroque style and consists of three floors, Mansard roof and a cellar. The facade on Boldhusgade is nine bays long while the facade fronting the canal is just three bays long.  The roof is clad with black-glazed tiles. A three-bay wall dormer faces Boldhusgade and a single-bay wall dormer faces Ved Stranden. The four-storey side wing is five bays long.

Gallery

Today
The building is now owned by Caroline Sundorph Pontoppidan. The ground floor is home to a combined wine shop, wine bar and lunch restaurant in the ground floor.

See also
 Listed buildings in Copenhagen Municipality

References

External links
 Ved Stranden 10 Wine Bar
 Spurce
 Source

Listed residential buildings in Copenhagen
Baroque architecture in Copenhagen
Houses completed in 1796
1796 establishments in Denmark